Maulana Shah Abdul Aziz (مولانا شاہ عبدالعزیز) is a Pakistani Islamic scholar and politician who served as Member of the 12th National Assembly of Pakistan from 2002 to 2007.

References

Living people
Year of birth missing (living people)
Pakistani Islamic religious leaders
Pakistani MNAs 2002–2007
Jamiat Ulema-e-Islam (F) politicians
People from Karak District
Pakistani Sunni Muslim scholars of Islam